Parapercis snyderi, commonly known as Snyder's grubfish or U-mark sandperch, is a marine fish native to the waters off northern Australia and Indonesia. The specific name honours the ichthyologist John Otterbein Snyder who collected the type specimen with David Starr Jordan, one of the co-describers of the species, at Nagasaki.

References

External links
 
 Parapercis snider @ fishesofaustralia.net.au

Pinguipedidae
Marine fish of Southeast Asia
Marine fish of Northern Australia
Taxa named by David Starr Jordan
Taxa named by Edwin Chapin Starks
Fish described in 1905